Patrick James Hannivan (April 20, 1866  – November 5, 1908) was a Canadian professional baseball player. He played part of the 1897 season in Major League Baseball for the Brooklyn Bridegrooms. He appeared in three games as an outfielder and two games as a second baseman.

External links

1866 births
1908 deaths
19th-century baseball players
Brooklyn Bridegrooms players
Canadian expatriate baseball players in the United States
Major League Baseball outfielders
Major League Baseball second basemen
Providence Clamdiggers (baseball) players
Reading Actives players
Jacksonville Lunatics players
Providence Grays (minor league) players
Dover (minor league baseball) players
Pawtucket Maroons players
Pawtucket Phenoms players
Lancaster Maroons players
Syracuse Stars (minor league baseball) players
Toronto Canucks players
Toronto Maple Leafs (International League) players
Rome Romans players
Major League Baseball players from Canada
Seattle Chinooks players